Tignish is a Canadian town located in Prince County, Prince Edward Island.

It has a population of 719. The name "Tignish" is derived from the Mi'kmaq "Mtagunich", meaning "paddle". The name is also believed to come from a Gaelic phrase meaning “Home Place”.

Tignish was founded in the late 1790s by nine francophone Acadian families, with further immigrants (mostly Irish) arriving in the 19th century and settling mostly in the nearby smaller locality of Anglo–Tignish (meaning "English Tignish"). Many of Tignish residents today are either of Acadian or Irish heritage.

One of the town's most popular and defining structures is the local Catholic church, St. Simon & St. Jude Catholic Church, which was among the first major structures built in Tignish,  constructed between 1857 and 1860. Tignish was designated a community or village in 1952. It changed its status to a town in 2017.

Demographics 

History 

Tignish was settled in 1799 by eight Acadian families. Two Irish families joined them in 1811. 

Tignish was once the western terminus of the Prince Edward Island Railway.  Rail service to the town was abandoned in 1989.

Community 

Fishing is one of the most important aspects of daily life and employment in Tignish, with many local families depending on this industry for income. There are three functioning harbors located in the Tignish area: the Tignish harbour, the Skinner's Pond harbour, and the Seacow Pond harbour.

Among the businesses in Tignish include the Tignish Heritage Inn, which was a convent from 1867 through 1991, Eugene's General Store, Judy's Take-out (until 2013), Shirley's restaurant, Tignish Co-op grocery store, hardware store, and gas station, Tignish Cultural Center, Cousin's Diner (until 2016), Pizza Shack (until 2012), and Perry's Construction.

Citizens of Tignish celebrated the bicentennial of Tignish in 1999. Among local festivities were Acadian music, local parties, carnivals, and the creation of a local music CD rich with the voices of Tignish residents. In addition, each summer there is a bluegrass festival that is held in Tignish.

Education 
Kindergarten–12 students in the Tignish area mostly attend Tignish Elementary School from grades K–6, followed by Merritt E. Callaghan Intermediate and Westisle Composite High schools for grades 7–12.

Government 
Tignish is within district #27 of PEI's electoral boundaries, which is labeled the Tignish–Palmer Road division. There is a polling station at the Tignish fire hall, and others located elsewhere in Tignish as well as in St. Felix and Palmer Road. The name of the district used to be "Tignish–DeBlois", but was changed to "Tignish–Palmer Road" before the 2007 provincial election with slight boundary changes. As of the 2011 provincial election, Hal Perry is the MLA for the region. Perry left the PCs and joined the Liberals on 3 October 2013. As a Liberal, Perry won re-election in 2015 and 2019.

Surrounding communities 
Nearby smaller localities, considered to be "part of" Tignish due to their proximity, include:

Ascension (2 mi NW of Tignish)
St. Felix (2 mi S)
Harper (2 mi SW)
Leoville (3.5 mi SW)
Peterville (2.5 mi SW)
Nail Pond (3 mi N)
Greenmount (3.5 mi S)
Skinner's Pond (5 mi NW)
St. Peter and St. Paul (3 mi S)
Kildare North (4 mi SE)
Tignish Shore (2 mi E)
Anglo Tignish (2 mi NE)
Seacow Pond (5 mi NE)
Norway (6 mi NE)
Christopher’s Cross (1 mile NE)

Mars crater namesake 
The name "Tignish" has been adopted by the International Astronomical Union for a crater on the surface of Mars. The crater is located at −30.71 degrees south by 86.9 degrees east on the Martian surface.

Climate 
Tignish experiences a humid continental climate (Koppen: Dfb) with four seasons, with winter being the longest. Summers are very mild to warm due to the Gulf of St Lawrence moderating temperatures during the warmer months. Wintertime is very cold with daily highs often below freezing.

See also 
List of communities in Prince Edward Island
St. Simon & St. Jude Church (Tignish)

References

External links 

Communities in Prince County, Prince Edward Island
Populated places established in 1799
Towns in Prince Edward Island
Populated coastal places in Canada